The Green House is a historic house at 1224 West 21st Street in Little Rock, Arkansas.  It is a single-story wood-frame structure, with front-facing gable roof and weatherboard siding.  A section with a smaller gable projects forward, and the main entrance on the left side, under a projecting gable.  All gables have exposed rafter ends in the Craftsman style.  It was built in 1916, and was from the 1930s home to the Ernest Green family, whose son Ernest, Jr. was the first African-American student to graduate from Little Rock Central High School.

The house was listed on the National Register of Historic Places in 1999.

See also
National Register of Historic Places listings in Little Rock, Arkansas

References

Houses on the National Register of Historic Places in Arkansas
Houses completed in 1957
Houses in Little Rock, Arkansas
National Register of Historic Places in Little Rock, Arkansas